The Lover's Gift is a 1914 American silent short film. The film starred Earle Foxe, Mary Alden, Francelia Billington and George Siegmann.

External links

American silent short films
1914 films
American black-and-white films
1910s American films